The Adventures of Jo, Zette and Jocko is a Franco-Belgian comics series created by Hergé, the writer-artist best known for The Adventures of Tintin. The heroes of the series are two young children, brother and sister Jo and Zette Legrand, and their pet chimpanzee Jocko, plus their parents, Mr Legrand, Jo and Zette’s father, aerospace engineer and designer, and Mrs Legrand, Jo and Zette’s mother, housewife and Mr Legrand’s wife.

Jo, Zette and Jocko appear on the rear covers of some The Adventures of Tintin comic books, but never appear in the stories. A few Jo, Zette and Jocko comics allude to characters or events in The Adventures of Tintin, such as the Maharaja of Gopal (briefly mentioned in The Castafiore Emerald) appearing as a prominent character, and a portrait of Captain Haddock in the Legrand house.

Synopsis

The following are the five Jo, Zette and Jocko titles, both in English and French, which are published between 1951 and 1957.

Characters

The Legrand Family

Jo 

Jo Legrand is the oldest of the Legrand children. He is the son of Mr and Mrs Legrand.

Zette 

Zette Legrand is the youngest of the Legrand children. She is the sister of Jo Legrand and the daughter of Mr and Mrs Legrand.

Jocko 

Jocko is Jo and Zette’s pet chimpanzee. He is the cheekiest primate character.

Mr Legrand 

Mr Legrand is Jo and Zette’s father. He works for S.A.F.C.A. (a French Aerospace Company) as a designer and aviation engineer.

Mrs Legrand 

Mrs Legrand is Jo and Zette’s mother and also Mr Legrand’s wife. She looks after her children at home.

Recurring characters

Mr. Pump 

Mr. John Archibald Pump was an American multimillionaire. In Mr Pump’s Legacy, he appeared briefly before being killed in a car accident. He leaves behind his two nephews, William and Fred Stockrise.

Werner and Charlie Brooke 

Werner Brooke and Charlie Brooke are the two villains in both volumes of The Adventures of Jo, Zette and Jocko: Mr Pump’s Legacy and Destination New York.

Fred and William Stockrise 

Fred Stockrise and William Stockrise are Mr Pump’s two nephews. They are also both villains. Alongside Werner and Charlie Brooke, the Stockrise brothers also appear in both volumes of The Adventures of Jo, Zette and Jocko: Mr Pump’s Legacy and Destination New York.

Professor Nielsen 

Professor Nielsen is Jo and Zette’s explorer who looked after them when Jo and Zette’s plane crash landed in the North Pole.

Others 

The mad scientist (The Manitoba No Reply & The Eruption of Karamako)
Maharajah of Gopal (The Valley of the Cobras)

History

Background
Beginning a series of newspaper supplements in late 1928, Abbé Norbert Wallez founded a supplement for children, Le Petit Vingtième (The Little Twentieth), which subsequently appeared in Le XXe Siècle every Thursday. Carrying strong Catholic and fascist messages, many of its passages were explicitly anti-semitic. For this new venture, Hergé illustrated L'Extraordinaire Aventure de Flup, Nénesse, Poussette et Cochonnet (The Extraordinary Adventure of Flup, Nénesse, Poussette and Cochonnet), a comic strip authored by one of the paper's sport columnists, which told the story of two boys, one of their little sisters, and her inflatable rubber pig. Hergé was unsatisfied, and eager to write and draw a comic strip of his own. He was fascinated by new techniques in the medium – such as the systematic use of speech bubbles – found in such American comics as George McManus' Bringing up Father, George Herriman's Krazy Kat and Rudolph Dirks's Katzenjammer Kids, copies of which had been sent to him from Mexico by the paper's reporter Léon Degrelle, stationed there to report on the Cristero War.

Publication

In late 1935 Hergé was visited by Abbot Courtois and Abbot Pihan, the editors of Cœurs Vaillants ("Valiant Hearts"), a French Catholic newspaper that was publishing The Adventures of Tintin. Courtois was often unhappy with elements of Hergé's work, and had recently complained about a scene in his latest story, The Broken Ear, in which the two antagonists drown and are dragged to Hell by demons. On this occasion, he asked Hergé to create new characters who would be more relateable for their young readership. Whereas Tintin had no parents and did not go to school, they wanted a series in which the protagonists had a family and acted more "normal"; they also requested that these characters have their adventures in France.

Hergé did not want to displease the editors, recognising that Cœurs Vaillants was his only foothold in the French market at the time. He later related that "I happened to have some toys at home just then, for an advertising project I was working on, and among them was a monkey named Jocko. And so I based a new little family around Jocko, really just to please the gentlemen from Cœurs Vaillants, telling myself they might have the right idea." Taking on Jo, Zette, & Jocko alongside The Adventures of Tintin and Quick & Flupke, Hergé soon found himself overworked, and put the latter series on the back burner.

The first Jo, Zette & Jocko adventure was titled The Secret Ray, and began serialisation in Cœurs Vaillants on 19 January 1936. It would continue to appear in the newspaper in installments until June 1937, throughout being printed in red and black. Several months later it also began to appear in the pages of Le Petit Vingtième. For New Year 1938, Hergé designed a special cover for Le Petit Vingtième in which the characters of Jo, Zette and Jocko were featured alongside those from The Adventures of Tintin and Quick & Flupke.

Hergé was unhappy with the series, commenting that its characters "bored me terribly, these parents who wept all the time as they searched for their children who had gone off in all directions.  The characters didn't have the total freedom enjoyed by Tintin... Think of Jules Renard's phrase 'Not everyone can be an orphan!' How lucky for Tintin; he is an orphan, and so he is free."

Le Thermozéro
Le Thermozéro is the sixth, incomplete, Jo, Zette and Jocko adventure. It began in 1958 as a Tintin adventure of the same name. The Tintin version is also known as Tintin et le Thermozéro. Hergé had asked the French comic book creator Greg (Michel Regnier) to provide a scenario for a new Tintin story. Greg came up with two potential plots: Les Pilules (The Pills) and Le Thermozéro. Hergé made sketches of the first eight pages of Le Thermozéro  before the project was abandoned in 1960 – Hergé deciding that he wished to retain sole creative control of his work.

Sometime after this, Hergé sought to resurrect Le Thermozéro as a Jo, Zette and Jocko adventure and instructed his long-time collaborator Bob de Moor to work on an outline. Bernard Tordeur of the Hergé Foundation has suggested, at the World of Tintin Conference held at the National Maritime Museum, Greenwich on May 15, 2004, that a complete draft outline (similar to what survives of Tintin and Alph-Art) was completed before the project was terminated  This draft version of the book apparently survives in the Tintin Archives.

Critical analysis
Commenting on The Secret Ray, Hergé biographer Benoît Peeters noted that it "used rather conventional elements to vivid effect", using many clichés from popular novels such as a robot, a mad scientist, and gullible cannibals. He criticised the characters as being "so colorless that we can hardly bring ourselves to care what befalls them." When discussing its sequel, The Stratoship H-22, he thought that it had been "conceived in almost a single burst" from a "general framework", in this way operating in a more linear fashion than he did with his Adventures of Tintin.
He felt that the series' "failure" was not inevitable, as evidence noting that comics series involving families, such as George McManus' Bringing up Father, could be popular.

English translations
The Valley of the Cobras was the first Jo, Zette and Jocko adventure to be translated and published in English in 1986. Mr Pump’s Legacy and Destination New York followed in 1987.

The ‘Manitoba’ No Reply and The Eruption of Karamako remained unpublished (possibly due to Hergé’s unsympathetic depiction of the primitive natives of the island of Karamako, similar to Tintin in the Congo) until 1994 when they were published together in a single limited-edition double volume titled The Secret Ray.

Farsi translations
While Herge's Adventures of Tintin were published in early 1970s in Iran, all of The Adventures of Jo, Zette and Jocko books got translated to Farsi and published in early 1980s almost at the same time by "Original"(اوریژینال) publication for the first time. The 'Manitoba' No Reply (Le Manitoba ne répond plus) was translated with title "آدم آهنی" (Adam Ahani=Iron Man), The Eruption of Karamako (L'Eruption du Karamako) was translated "انفجار کاراماکو" (Enfejareh Karamako), Mr. Pump’s Legacy (Le Testament de Monsieur Pump) was translated "جنون سرعت" (Jonoon Soraat=Speed Maniac), Destination New York (Destination New York) was translated "مقصد نیویورک" (Magsad Neyoyork), The Valley of the Cobras (La Vallée des cobras) was translated "دره مارها" (Dareh Marha=Valley of Snakes).

See also

The Adventures of Tintin, popular Belgian comic series created by Hergé.

References

Footnotes

Bibliography 

 
 
 
 
 
 
 
 
 
 

Belgian comic strips
Belgian comics titles
Comics by Hergé
Comics about monkeys
Fictional Belgian people
1936 comics debuts
Comics characters introduced in 1936
1957 comics endings
Adventure comics
Humor comics
Belgian comics characters
Comics about women
Male characters in comics
Female characters in comics
Child characters in comics
Fictional chimpanzees
Hergé  characters